Anoectochilus yatesiae, commonly known as the marbled jewel orchid, is a species of orchid that is endemic to northern Queensland. It has up to six dark green leaves with a network of silvery veins and up to four hairy brownish and white flowers.

Description
Anoectochilus yatesiae is a tuberous, perennial herb with up to six leaves forming a rosette on the end of its fleshy rhizome. The lateral sepals are a similar length to the dorsal sepal but narrower and spread apart from each other. Flowering occurs from July to September.

Taxonomy and naming
Anoectochilus yatesiae was first formally described in 1907 by Frederick Manson Bailey from specimens collected near Kuranda and the description was published in the Queensland Agricultural Journal. The specific epithet (yatesiae) honours "Mrs. Arthur Yates", one of the collectors of the type specimen.

Distribution and habitat
The marbled jewel orchid grows in highland rainforest between the Bloomfield River and Paluma Range National Park.

References

yatesiae
Orchids of Queensland
Endemic orchids of Australia
Plants described in 1907
Taxa named by Frederick Manson Bailey